The Royal Football Federation of the Principality of Asturias (RFFPA) is the federation responsible for managing association football in the Principality of Asturias. Its current president is Maximino Martínez Suárez.

RFFPA manages Asturian leagues from Tercera División (Group 2) to the Regional lower divisions, the Regional stage of the Copa Federación and the Autonomous team, which plays in the UEFA Regions' Cup.

History 
The current RFFPA started in 1913 with the creation of the first autonomous federation. It consisted of six teams and has been chaired by several presidents.

On 21 December, in that same year, the RFFPA received the official backing of the Spanish Football Federation, authorizing the use by the newly created body Cantabrian Federation of Football Club. On 22 November 1916, the Spanish Federation decided that Santander resign from the Northern Federation and be integrated into the Cantabrian Federation, until 1918 when it returned to its former Federation, with 28 May of that year being when the Assembly National Federation agreed to change the name of the Cantabrian Federation of Asturian Regional Federation of Football Clubs.

On 30 June 1919 due to the reform of its Constitution and Bylaws, the RFFPA expands its sports district to join the federation the provinces of León, Palencia and later those of Zamora and Burgos. It changed its name on 6 August 1933 to the Asturian Federation Cup, and in May 1941 to underwent a new transformation to become Astur-Montañesa Federation Cup, which governed the sport in good order the provinces of Asturias, León, Palencia, Santander, Burgos, Zamora and Salamanca, until at last, in 1952, the RFFPA was restored to the Asturian Federation denomination with only the province of Asturias.

In 1985, under Decree 71/1985 of the Concierge of Education, Culture and Sport, RFFPA becomes the current Football Federation of Asturias. This was the most important date in recent years because it allowed the acquisition of legal personality to enable a territorial assembly legislation, which since 1986 has stipulated that its own Rules and Regulations, whose obvious advantages are reflected in the processes arising from natural or legal persons who depend on our territorial federative organization, the ETF, solely and exclusively on those competitions in excess of the Asturias principality territory.

The average weekly meetings are 500, which in quantity are very difficult to overcome in terms of the population of the region. Appearing in recent years are new forms of soccer like futbol 7 and women's soccer, as well as the specialty of indoor football, which have gained important steps to become fully integrated into the organization and the federal competition entity with the power and sufficient conditions equal to the rest of the members.

As regards to its coaching staff, there are the School Committee of Referees, Coaches and School Committee, indoor football Referees Technical Committee, which are well targeted and developed within the organization's Regulations. It is fair to point out the synchronism between them and the Federation itself, with optimal results in the operation of schools by holding regular courses and degrees resulting in both coaches and referees.

Since April 1977 HRH Felipe de Borbón, Prince of Asturias, holds the honorary presidency of the Football Federation of Asturias.

Competitions
The Royal Asturias Football Federation organises the following competitions:
Tercera División, group 2
Divisiones Regionales de Fútbol in Asturias
Women's regional league
Copa Federación de España (Asturias tournament)

Champions

Tercera División
In bold, champions and runners-up that promoted to Segunda División B.

Notable clubs affiliated with RFFPA 
Segunda División
Oviedo
Sporting Gijón
Segunda División B
Langreo
Marino Luanco
Segunda División Pro (women)
Oviedo
Sporting Gijón
Primera Nacional (women)
Gijón
Oviedo

Presidents

International referees from the RFFPA
Mariano Medina Iglesias
Manuel Díaz Vega
Manuel Mejuto González
César Muñiz Fernández

References

External links 
 

Asturias
Football in Asturias
Sports organizations established in 1915
1915 establishments in Spain
Organisations based in Spain with royal patronage